Sir Francis Murphy (1809 – 30 March 1891) was an Australian politician, first Speaker of the Victorian Legislative Assembly.

Life
Murphy was the son of Francis D. Murphy, who was for upwards of thirty years head of the South of Ireland Transport of Convicts Department. Francis was born in Cork, Ireland, in 1809, and after being educated in his native city, entered at Trinity College, Dublin, as a medical student, ultimately being admitted M.R.C.S. of London.

In June 1836 Dr. Murphy emigrated to Sydney, New South Wales, and was immediately nominated by the Governor Sir Richard Bourke to a position on the staff of colonial surgeons. On appointment he proceeded to take charge of a portion of the southern district in the county of Argyle, but soon afterwards being led into agricultural pursuits, he resigned his official position, and finally discontinued practice as a medical man. After leaving the Government service, Dr. Murphy purchased a considerable quantity of land at Argyle, and soon became the largest grain-grower in the district. He married in 1840 Agnes, eldest daughter of Lieutenant David Reid, R.N., of Inverary Park, N.S.W., and in 1847 went to Victoria, where he purchased a station on the Ovens river, in the Beechworth district.

Dr. Murphy began serving in the partially elective Victorian Legislative Council for the Murray district at the first election which took place after the separation of Victoria from New South Wales. He was for some time Chairman of Committees, and in 1852 he sold his pastoral property and went to reside permanently in Melbourne. In 1853 he was re-elected for the Murray, and resigned the chairmanship of committees to become President of the Central Road Board, which latter position he relinquished in November 1856. He was acting Speaker in the council during the absence, on account of illness, of Dr. (later Sir) James Frederick Palmer in March 1855.

When responsible government was conceded, Murphy was elected to the first Legislative Assembly of Victoria for the Murray Boroughs, and appointed the first Speaker of the House in October 1856. To this post he was re-elected in 1859, 1861, 1864, 1866, and 1868, and held it continuously until the dissolution of Parliament on 24 January 1871, when he resigned, having in the meantime been knighted in 1860. 
In 1866, Sir Francis Murphy left Murray Boroughs and was returned for the Grenville electorate until 1871, when he was defeated, and was out of Parliament until the next year, when he entered the Upper House as member for the Eastern Province.

Murphy was in 1861 a member of the commission on the Burke and Wills expedition, and in 1863 chairman of the league directed against further transportation. He was chairman of the National Bank of Australasia and director of other companies. Murphy was one of the three Australian commissioners tasked by the Government of New Zealand with choosing a new capital for that country. Together with Joseph Docker (New South Wales) and Ronald Campbell Gunn (Tasmania), he recommended for the capital to move from Auckland to Wellington.

Murphy resigned his seat in council in 1876, and resided for some time in England. He died on 30 March 1891, at his residence, St. Kilda Road, Melbourne, and was buried in Boroondara cemetery.

Family
In 1840 Murphy married the daughter of Lieutenant-Doctor Reid, R.N., a settler in his neighbourhood. He left six daughters and three sons, one of whom, Frank Reid Murphy, was a member of the Legislative Assembly of Queensland.

References

Attribution

1809 births
1890 deaths
Members of the Victorian Legislative Assembly
Speakers of the Victorian Legislative Assembly
Members of the Victorian Legislative Council
19th-century Australian politicians